Annia Cornificia Faustina (122/123between 152 and 158) was the youngest child and only daughter of the praetor Marcus Annius Verus and Domitia Lucilla. The parents of Cornificia came from wealthy senatorial families who were of consular rank. Her brother was the future Roman emperor Marcus Aurelius, and both were born and raised in Rome.

History 
In 124, the father of Cornificia died and she and her brother were raised by their mother and their paternal grandfather, the Roman Senator Marcus Annius Verus, who died in 138. Relations between her and her brother appeared to be good. Before Cornificia had married, she had settled her paternal inheritance with her brother.

Ronald Syme identifies her husband as one of the suffect consuls in 146, recorded in the Fasti Ostienses as Gaius Annianus Verus, but whom he claims had the full name of Gaius Ummidius Quadratus Annianus Verus. He was descended from one of the leading aristocratic and politically influential families in Rome and was a direct descendant of the late Gaius Ummidius Durmius Quadratus, one time suffect consul.

Cornificia bore Annianus Verus two children:
 Marcus Ummidius Quadratus Annianus
 Ummidia Cornificia Faustina

Sources
 Marcus Aurelius, by Anthony Richard Birley, Routledge, 2000
 From Tiberius to the Antonines: a history of the Roman Empire AD 14–192, by Albino Garzetti, 1974
 Meditations by Marcus Aurelius
 Augustan History – Marcus Aurelius

References

External links
 Statue Bust of Annia Cornificia Faustina from a Portuguese Historical Site

120s births
150s births
Year of birth uncertain
Year of death uncertain
2nd-century Roman women
Nerva–Antonine dynasty
Cornificia Faustina
Annia Faustina
2nd-century Romans